Storws Wen Golf Club is a golf course in Brynteg, Benllech, Wales, on the Isle of Anglesey.

It was built in 1996 by Ken and Eleri Jones. They were also the first Captains for the golf club.
Storws Wen is a nine-hole golf course situated on Anglesey in Brynteg.

References
 UK Golf Guide - Storws Wen Golf Club
 Welsh Golf Courses

External links
Storws Wen Golf Club 

Golf clubs and courses in Wales
1996 establishments in Wales